Joëlle De Keukeleire (born 27 September 1959) is a Belgian gymnast. She competed in five events at the 1976 Summer Olympics.

References

External links
 

1959 births
Living people
Belgian female artistic gymnasts
Olympic gymnasts of Belgium
Gymnasts at the 1976 Summer Olympics
People from Uccle
Sportspeople from Brussels